Clathria pachystyla, the orange finger sponge, is a species of demosponge from the coast of South Africa.

Description 
Fused branches arise from flat blades. It is somewhat compressible and tears with some force.

Distribution and habitat 

References 

Demospongiae
Biodiversity of South Africa
Animals described in 1963